RNA, U12 small nuclear is a protein that in humans is encoded by the RNU12 gene.

References

Further reading